Franklin Township is a township in Lee County, Iowa, in the United States.

History
Franklin Township was organized in 1841.

References

Townships in Lee County, Iowa
Townships in Iowa